State Highway 81 (SH-81) is a state highway in Bihar state. It covers two major districts (Bhojpur district and Rohtas district) of Bihar state. This state highway starts from Sakaddi near Arrah and ends at Nasriganj near Dehri-on-Sone and Daudnagar.

In Bihar, it is known as the Chandi-Nasriganj road.

Route
The route of SH-81 from north to south direction is as follows:

 Sakaddi (near Arrah)
 Kulharia railway station 
 Chandi
 Jalpura Tapa
 Akhgaon 
 Sandesh
 Sahar (near Arwal)
 Nasriganj

Note: 
 from Sakaddi, national highway NH-922 move west towards Arrah and east towards Koilwar, Bihta, Danapur and Patna.
 from Nasriganj, state highway (SH-15) move towards Dehri-on-Sone and national highway (NH-120) move towards Daudnagar and Bikramganj.

References 

State Highways in Bihar
Transport in Bihar
State Highways
Bihar State Highways
State Highways